Byton is a village and civil parish in Herefordshire, England. Byton is situated on the River Lugg, near the border with Wales.  According to the 2001 census, it had a population of 93, increasing to 184 at the 2011 census.

References

External links

Villages in Herefordshire
Civil parishes in Herefordshire